Kamakhya Junction railway station is a railway junction station located at Maligaon in Guwahati in the Indian state of Assam.

Location 
The station lies near to the headquarters of Northeast Frontier Railway. It is the second-largest railway station of Guwahati after Guwahati railway station.

Station facilities
Kamakhya junction has upgraded its passenger amenities in recent past. The station is being developed jointly with the Union Ministry of Tourism.

Following services available in Kamakhya Junction:
 10 (02 Bedded) AC Retiring Rooms with Free Wi-Fi/TV/Charging point 
 01 (10 Bedded) AC Dormitory with Free Wi-Fi/TV/Locker for Gents 
 01 (10 Bedded) AC Dormitory with Free Wi-Fi/TV/Locker for Ladies 
 High Speed  Google Railwire Free Wi-Fi service 
 Upper Class/Lower Class Waiting Rooms having 120 seat capacity with Free Wi-Fi/AC/TV/Charging points/Drinking water & separate Ladies/Gents Washrooms 
 Veg/Non Veg Food Court 
 Cafeteria 
 FOB with 5x Escalators/Elevators  1x
 CCTV Surveillance 
 Cloak Room

Major Trains

Kamakhya - Lokmanya Tilak Terminus AC Superfast Express
Kamakhya - Sir M. Visvesvaraya Terminal AC Superfast Express
Kamakhya–Shri Mata Vaishno Devi Katra Express
Kamakhya–Gandhidham Superfast Express
Kamakhya - Lokmanya Tilak Terminus Karmabhoomi Express.
Kamakhya - Udaipur City Kavi Guru Express
Kamakhya - Jodhpur, Bhagat Ki Kothi Express
Kamakhya - Delhi Brahmaputra Mail
Kamakhya - Dr. Ambedkar Nagar Express
Kamakhya - Ranchi Express
Kamakhya - Anand Vihar Terminal Northeast Express
Kamakhya - Puri Express via Howrah
Kamakhya - Puri Express (via Adra)
Kamakhya–Gaya Express
Kamakhya - Gomti Nagar Superfast Express

References

External links
 

Railway junction stations in Assam
Railway stations in Guwahati
Lumding railway division